An adult bar/bat mitzvah is a bar or bat mitzvah of a person older than the customary age. Traditionally, a bar or bat mitzvah occurs at age 13 for boys and 12 for girls. However, many adult Jews who have never had a bar or bat mitzvah choose to have one later in life, and many who have had one at the traditional age choose to have a second. An adult bar or bat mitzvah can be held at any age after adulthood is reached and can be performed in a variety of ways.

The adult bar/bat mitzvah, which can be held at any age, differs from the child's bar/bat mitzvah in that it is usually planned by the person themselves instead of their parents. Due to it taking place at an advanced stage of life, many relatives who are often present at a child's bar/bat mitzvah are deceased, and the person is often married and/or has children and sometimes grandchildren. Many men have second bar mitzvahs at the age of 83, representing 70 years since their first.

Reasons 
There are many reasons adult Jews choose to have a bar or bat mitzvah:
 Many adult women do not have a bat mitzvah as children due to lack of popularity.
 Some adults who have learning disabilities may have, so to say, failed Hebrew school and they therefore could have suffered from emotional instability, so they choose to wait until adulthood.
 Adults who have converted to Judaism may want a bar or bat mitzvah.
 Many non-religious Jews either had little or no Jewish education as children.
 Those who have had a bar or bat mitzvah as children decide to undergo renewal. 
Transgender Jews who had a bar or bat mitzvah as their gender assigned at birth may wish to have the other one as an adult, using their new gender and name.
 Many Holocaust survivors didn't have the opportunity to become a bar or bat mitzvah.

History 
Rabbi Albert Axelrad of Brandeis University officiated the first adult bar and bat mitzvahs in the early 1970s. He encouraged the practice in all denominations of Judaism.

Between 1995 and 2001, Hadassah held group adult Bat Mitzvah ceremonies for 180 women.

In 2001, the Union for Reform Judaism created a guide on adult bar and bat mitzvah programs which was adopted by 900 congregations. In 2002, the Conservative Movement adopted this guide as well.

Process 
The process of becoming a bar or bat mitzvah for adults involves studying for a year or longer. It consists of Hebrew language, Jewish rituals, Torah readings, and Haftorah readings. Many synagogues provide classes for adults.

Notable adult bar and bat mitzvahs 
 Paula Abdul had an adult bat mitzvah in Safed on November 2, 2013, at the age of 51. She had originally planned to hold it at the Western Wall in Jerusalem but changed her plans due to jet lag and the media circus that would follow.
 Armand Hammer died on December 11, 1990, on the evening before his planned bar mitzvah at age 92.
 In June 2012, actor David Arquette celebrated his bar mitzvah aged 40 at the Kotel. 
 In October 2015, actor James Franco celebrated his bar mitzvah aged 37.
 Yisrael Kristal held his bar mitzvah at the age of 113. He was the world's oldest living man at the time.
 In December 2019, comedian Tiffany Haddish celebrated her bat mitzvah aged 40.
In popular culture, there have been depictions of adult bar mitzvahs on TV shows:
 An episode during the last season of The Dick Van Dyke Show depicts Buddy having his bar mitzvah, having been too poor to have one as a boy.
 The Simpsons episode "Today I Am a Clown" depicts Krusty the Klown having a bar mitzvah.
 On an episode of Touched by an Angel, Kirk Douglas played a man who (like Douglas himself) has a second bar mitzvah at the age of 83.

References

External links 
 My Jewish Learning - The Adult Bar/Bat Mitzvah

Jewish law and rituals
Judaism and women
Bar and bat mitzvah